Inventory analysis is one of the branches of Operation Research which deals in studying and understanding the stock/product mix combined with the knowledge of the demand for stock/product. It is the technique to determine the optimum level of inventory for a firm.

Computing inventory balances 
 Average-cost method
 First in first out 
 Last in first out

References

Inventory optimization